The 1952 Washington State Cougars football team was an American football team that represented Washington State College during the 1952 college football season. First-year head coach Al Kircher led the team to a 3–4 mark in the Pacific Coast Conference (PCC) and 4–6 overall.

Three home games were played on campus in Pullman at Rogers Field, and one in Spokane, the finale against rival Washington.

Kircher was previously the backfield coach under head coach Forest Evashevski, who left for Iowa in January, and he was promoted the following week.

Schedule

References

External links
 Game program: Stanford at WSC – September 27, 1952
 Game program: Oregon State at WSC – October 25, 1952
 Game program: Idaho at WSC – November 1, 1952
 Game program: Washington vs. WSC at Spokane – November 29, 1952

Washington State
Washington State Cougars football seasons
Washington State Cougars football